Jeanne Cummings is a political reporter and columnist. Until June 2015, when she returned to the Wall Street Journal, she was reporter and Government Team Deputy Editor at Bloomberg News in Washington, D.C. She joined Bloomberg in 2011, and in 2014 served as liaison between Bloomberg's Washington operation and the Mark Halperin-and-John Heilemann-led Bloomberg Politics project. More recently, she had been writing columns for Bloomberg.

Previously she was assistant managing editor for the Politico news organization. Cummings is a frequent panelist on the PBS political discussion program Washington Week.  Earlier, she had served on the Washington bureaus of the Atlanta Journal-Constitution and the Wall Street Journal. She left the Wall Street Journal for Politico in 2007.

Cummings is a native of Maryland. She graduated cum laude from the University of Maryland in 1979 with a bachelor's degree in journalism and a minor in political science.

References

 Jeanne Cummings, Charlie Rose Show, What's on Charlie Rose, accessed: 7 Oct 2011.
 Jeanne Cummings | Washington Week, accessed: 7 Oct 2011.

External links

American women journalists
Living people
Year of birth missing (living people)
University of Maryland, College Park alumni
21st-century American women